Pindra  is one of the 403 constituencies of the Uttar Pradesh Legislative Assembly, India. It is a part of the Varanasi district and one of the five assembly constituencies in the Machhlishahr Lok Sabha constituency. Pindra Assembly constituency came into existence in 2008 as a result of the "Delimitation of Parliamentary and Assembly Constituencies Order, 2008".

Wards / Areas
Pindra assembly constituency comprises the following Wards / areas.

Members of Legislative Assembly

Election results

2022

2017

See also

Pindra Tehsil
Varanasi
Government of Uttar Pradesh
List of Vidhan Sabha constituencies of Uttar Pradesh
Uttar Pradesh
Uttar Pradesh Legislative Assembly

References

External links
 

Assembly constituencies of Uttar Pradesh
Politics of Varanasi district
Constituencies established in 2008
2008 establishments in Uttar Pradesh